Corbett Arms Hotel is a Grade II listed building on Corbett Square Tywyn, Gwynedd. The building is located at one end of the Tywyn High Street near the recently (2010) refurbished Tywyn Cinema, The Magic Lantern.

The hotel was the principal hotel in Tywn and is first recorded in 1833. It was part of the estate of John Corbett of Ynysmaengwyn, who more than doubled the building in size and added a second 'T' to its name, originally The Corbet Arms.

The hotel is in a late Georgian style, three stories high and attic with a slate roof. It has been listed Grade II by Cadw since the 1970s.

References

Tywyn
Grade II listed buildings in Gwynedd
Georgian architecture in Wales
Buildings and structures completed in the 19th century
Hotels in Gwynedd